The Cortez Bridge is a double-leaf bascule bridge that connects the barrier islands of Bradenton Beach, and the mainland of Cortez, Florida. It crosses the Sarasota Bay, carries Cortez Road, part of SR 684, and was built in 1956, replacing a 
swing bridge built in 1921.

The current bridge was designated by the 1965 Legislature of Florida.

In 2017, the Florida Department of Transportation began plans replace the Cortez Bridge with a high-level bridge. Construction is expected to begin in the mid-2020's. The new bridge will be 65 feet above the surface, and it will allow 98% of boats to pass underneath.

References

See also 
Anna Maria Island Bridge
Longboat Pass Bridge

Bridges in Florida
Bradenton, Florida
Transportation buildings and structures in Manatee County, Florida